James Hamilton Charlesworth (born May 30, 1940) is an American academic who served as the George L. Collord Professor of New Testament Language and Literature until January 17, 2019, and Director of the Dead Sea Scrolls Project at the Princeton Theological Seminary. His research interests include the Apocrypha and Pseudepigrapha of the Hebrew and Christian Bibles, the Dead Sea Scrolls, Josephus, the Historical Jesus, the Gospel of John, and the Book of Revelation.

Works

Books

Charlesworth, James H., (1983). Old Testament Pseudepigrapha Vol.1 - Apocalyptic Literature and Testaments, New York, Doubleday_(publisher)

Articles and chapters

See also 
 Henoch (journal)

References

External links 
 Faculty profile
 Tour & Conference Schedule
 Journalist's Interview
 Journal Henoch website
 Enoch Seminar website
 4 Enoch: The Online Encyclopedia of Second Temple Judaism
 Foundation on Judaism and Christian Origins

1940 births
American biblical scholars
Critics of the Christ myth theory
Pseudepigraphy
Living people
Princeton Theological Seminary faculty